Raižiai Mosque is a wooden mosque located in the village of Raižiai, Alytus County in Lithuania. The mosque was the only one to operate during the Soviet era. The mosque remains open, with local Muslim religious gatherings during major holidays. The mosque serves as a center for activities for the 500 Tatars that live in the village.

Since 1999, the mosque has been designated a cultural heritage site (unique code 24828). In the village of Raižiai there are several Tatar cemeteries, where Lipka Tatars and Muslims of other nationalities are buried.

History

The mosque was first mentioned in sources dated from 1663, the current mosque was built in 1889. Renovated in 1993. The mosque houses the oldest remaining minbar from the Polish-Lithuanian Commonwealth (built 1686).

In 2010, to commemorate the 500th anniversary of the Battle of Grunwald, two sundials were installed near the mosque (constructed by Jonas Navikas), one of which shows the local time, the second in Grunwald, Poland.

See also
 Islam in Lithuania
 Kruszyniany Mosque, Lipka Tatar mosque in Poland
 Navahrudak Mosque, Lipka Tatar mosque in Belarus

References

Lipka Tatar mosques
Mosques completed in 1873
Mosques in Lithuania